In linear algebra, a diagonal matrix is a matrix in which the entries outside the main diagonal are all zero; the term usually refers to square matrices. Elements of the main diagonal can either be zero or nonzero. An identity matrix of any size, or any multiple of it (a scalar matrix), is a diagonal matrix.

A diagonal matrix is sometimes called a scaling matrix, since matrix multiplication with it results in changing scale (size). Its determinant is the product of its diagonal values.

Definition

As stated above, a diagonal matrix is a matrix in which all off-diagonal entries are zero. That is, the matrix  with n columns and n rows is diagonal if

However, the main diagonal entries are unrestricted.

For example:
 or 

The following matrix is square diagonal matrix:

If the entries are real numbers or complex numbers, then it is a normal matrix as well.

In the remainder of this article we will consider only square diagonal matrices, and refer to them simply as "diagonal matrices".

Vector-to-matrix diag operator

A diagonal matrix  can be constructed from a vector  using the  operator:

The same operator is also used to represent block diagonal matrices as  where each argument  is a matrix.

The  operator may be written as:

Matrix-to-vector diag operator

The inverse matrix-to-vector  operator is sometimes denoted by the identically named  where the argument is now a matrix and the result is a vector of its diagonal entries. 

The following property holds:

Scalar matrix 

A diagonal matrix with equal diagonal entries is a scalar matrix; that is, a scalar multiple λ of the identity matrix . Its effect on a vector is scalar multiplication by λ. For example, a 3×3 scalar matrix has the form:

The scalar matrices are the center of the algebra of matrices: that is, they are precisely the matrices that commute with all other square matrices of the same size. By contrast, over a field (like the real numbers), a diagonal matrix with all diagonal elements distinct only commutes with diagonal matrices (its centralizer is the set of diagonal matrices). Diagonal matrices where the diagonal entries are not all equal or all distinct have centralizers intermediate between the whole space and only diagonal matrices.

For an abstract vector space V (rather than the concrete vector space ), the analog of scalar matrices are scalar transformations. This is true more generally for a module M over a ring R, with the endomorphism algebra End(M) (algebra of linear operators on M) replacing the algebra of matrices. Formally, scalar multiplication is a linear map, inducing a map  (from a scalar λ to its corresponding scalar transformation, multiplication by λ) exhibiting End(M) as a R-algebra. For vector spaces, the scalar transforms are exactly the center of the endomorphism algebra, and, similarly, invertible transforms are the center of the general linear group GL(V). The former is more generally true free modules , for which the endomorphism algebra is isomorphic to a matrix algebra.

Vector operations 
Multiplying a vector by a diagonal matrix multiplies each of the terms by the corresponding diagonal entry. Given a diagonal matrix  and a vector , the product is:

This can be expressed more compactly by using a vector instead of a diagonal matrix, and taking the Hadamard product of the vectors (entrywise product), denoted :

This is mathematically equivalent, but avoids storing all the zero terms of this sparse matrix. This product is thus used in machine learning, such as computing products of derivatives in backpropagation or multiplying IDF weights in TF-IDF, since some BLAS frameworks, which multiply matrices efficiently, do not include Hadamard product capability directly.

Matrix operations 
The operations of matrix addition and matrix multiplication are especially simple for diagonal matrices. Write  for a diagonal matrix whose diagonal entries starting in the upper left corner are a1, ..., an. Then, for addition, we have

 +  = 

and for matrix multiplication,

  = .

The diagonal matrix  is invertible if and only if the entries a1, ..., an are all nonzero. In this case, we have

 = .

In particular, the diagonal matrices form a subring of the ring of all n-by-n matrices.

Operator matrix in eigenbasis 

As explained in determining coefficients of operator matrix, there is a special basis, for which the matrix  takes the diagonal form. The resulting equation is known as eigenvalue equation and used to derive the characteristic polynomial and, further, eigenvalues and eigenvectors.

Properties 

 The adjugate of a diagonal matrix is again diagonal.
 Where all matrices are square,
 A matrix is diagonal if and only if it is triangular and normal.
 A matrix is diagonal if and only if it is both upper- and lower-triangular.
 A diagonal matrix is symmetric.
 The identity matrix In and zero matrix are diagonal.
 A 1×1 matrix is always diagonal.

Applications 
Diagonal matrices occur in many areas of linear algebra. Because of the simple description of the matrix operation and eigenvalues/eigenvectors given above, it is typically desirable to represent a given matrix or linear map by a diagonal matrix.

In fact, a given n-by-n matrix  is similar to a diagonal matrix (meaning that there is a matrix  such that  is diagonal) if and only if it has  linearly independent eigenvectors. Such matrices are said to be diagonalizable.

Over the field of real or complex numbers, more is true. The spectral theorem says that every normal matrix is unitarily similar to a diagonal matrix (if  then there exists a unitary matrix  such that  is diagonal). Furthermore, the singular value decomposition implies that for any matrix , there exist unitary matrices  and  such that  is diagonal with positive entries.

Operator theory 
In operator theory, particularly the study of PDEs, operators are particularly easy to understand and PDEs easy to solve if the operator is diagonal with respect to the basis with which one is working; this corresponds to a separable partial differential equation. Therefore, a key technique to understanding operators is a change of coordinates—in the language of operators, an integral transform—which changes the basis to an eigenbasis of eigenfunctions: which makes the equation separable. An important example of this is the Fourier transform, which diagonalizes constant coefficient differentiation operators (or more generally translation invariant operators), such as the Laplacian operator, say, in the heat equation.

Especially easy are multiplication operators, which are defined as multiplication by (the values of) a fixed function–the values of the function at each point correspond to the diagonal entries of a matrix.

See also 

 Anti-diagonal matrix
 Banded matrix
 Bidiagonal matrix
 Diagonally dominant matrix
 Diagonalizable matrix
 Jordan normal form
 Multiplication operator
 Tridiagonal matrix
 Toeplitz matrix
 Toral Lie algebra
 Circulant matrix

Notes

References

Sources 

Matrix normal forms
Sparse matrices